Graviton (Franklin Hall) is a supervillain appearing in American comic books published by Marvel Comics. Created by writer Jim Shooter and artist Sal Buscema, he first appeared in The Avengers #158, dated April 1977. Over the years, he has mainly opposed the Avengers in their various incarnations.

Originally a gravity researcher, Franklin Hall gains the ability to control gravity.  Corrupted by this power, he becomes a supervillain using the name "Graviton". He is confronted and defeated by the Avengers as he tried to destroy the facility where he did his original research. In subsequent appearances Graviton seems to struggle with control of his powers and often loses because of this. More than one storyline has depicted Graviton's apparent death, only for him to return subsequently through various means. He later becomes part of Advanced Idea Mechanics' High Council as "Minister of Science".

Graviton has appeared in The Avengers: Earth's Mightiest Heroes animated series. Franklin Hall appeared in the Marvel Cinematic Universe TV series Agents of S.H.I.E.L.D. (portrayed by Ian Hart) in the first season. His Graviton identity (assumed by recurring character Glenn Talbot) also appeared in the series, portrayed by Adrian Pasdar, with Hall himself becoming an unseen entity trapped in the gravitonium that Talbot infused himself with.

Publication history 

Graviton first appears in The Avengers #158 (April 1977) and was created by Jim Shooter and Sal Buscema.

Fictional character biography 
Franklin Hall is a Canadian physicist involved in an experiment in a private research facility in the Canadian Rockies. A mistake in Hall's calculations causes graviton particles to be merged with his own molecules, and Hall later discovers that he can mentally control gravity. Hall at first tries to hide his newfound ability, but becomes tempted by the potential power, and donning a costume adopts the alias "Graviton".

When Graviton takes over the research facility and forbids all communications with the outside world, a fellow scientist sends a distress signal to the superhero team the Avengers. A furious Graviton then lifts the facility several thousands of feet into the sky and threatens to kill the scientist. The Avengers then arrive and attack but are all defeated when trapped in a gravity field. Graviton then proceeds to bring the facility to New York, and demands the U.N. to hand over world power or he will destroy the world's cities. At Avengers Mansion a returning Black Panther learns of their plight and joins with the thunder god Thor, having also been on leave from the team, and the two head to the facility. As Thor battles Graviton with Iron Man's help, the Panther frees the captive Avengers, but Graviton defeats them again until he is tricked into thinking a fellow scientist he cares for has committed suicide. Graviton then panics and causes the entire facility to collapse on him, forming a giant stone sphere that is dropped into a river by the Avengers.

Graviton later reappears, although is suffering from amnesia and is flickering in and out of existence. Somehow guided to the female scientist he has feelings for, Graviton attempts to abduct her but is stopped by Fantastic Four member the Thing and the Inhuman Black Bolt. During the battle, Graviton describes himself as becoming a "living black hole" and morphs into a  humanoid. Graviton is then attacked until he loses concentration, and then apparently implodes and is considered dead. Graviton is eventually able to reform his body, and decides to seek a bride. Elevating a Bloomingdale's store into the sky, he takes several women hostage until tricked by Thor. Thor then maroons a defeated Graviton in an alternate dimension.

Graviton is able to return when an anomaly opens a portal to Earth. Arriving in Los Angeles, Graviton attempts to unite all criminal elements under his leadership, but is defeated by the West Coast Avengers. Graviton was among the villains recruited by Mister Bitterhorn into Mephisto's Legion Accursed. They were used in part of a plot to kill the Beyonder with Mephisto's Beyondersbane weapon, but were delayed by the Thing until the weapon melted down. Graviton then recruits the supervillains Halflife, Quantum, and Zzzax as allies, but they are once again defeated by the West Coast Avengers. Graviton then defeats Spider-Man, and after a skirmish with the Fantastic Four, is defeated in turn by a cosmic-powered Spider-Man.

Graviton then attacks the Avengers again, but is defeated when they overload his powers, banishing him to yet another alternate dimension. He then sends out a distress signal, which is noticed by the villains Techno and Baron Zemo. Graviton is eventually freed and attacks the teams the Thunderbolts and Great Lakes Avengers, but is persuaded by Thunderbolt Moonstone to rethink his priorities. Desiring still more power, Graviton recruited a team of criminals and looted the city of San Francisco, until eventually defeated by the Thunderbolts – currently aided by Angel – with the use of technology from Machine Man, whose flight capabilities cancel gravity, allowing them to use arm-bands based on his technology to shut down Graviton's powers.

Banished once again to the same alternate dimension, Graviton becomes insane from the constant defeats and exile from Earth, and returns with the goal of total world conquest, accompanied by an adult-level P'tah named M'reel. Seeking revenge on the Thunderbolts, Graviton storms their headquarters to discover they have disbanded and been replaced by the group the Redeemers. Graviton kills almost the entire team before being defeated by a reformed Thunderbolts. Discovering that M'reel was channeling his power to create a dimensional warp enabling the P'tah to invade Earth a furious Graviton apparently dies stopping the alien invasion and saves the Thunderbolts.

Under unrevealed circumstances, Graviton returned to Earth once more and was rendered powerless long enough to be imprisoned on the Raft with other superhuman criminals. However, when Electro shorted out the Raft's defenses to free Sauron, Graviton and dozens of other inmates escaped, only to be confronted by the heroes who would soon organize as the latest incarnation of the Avengers. Although recaptured, Graviton evidently sustained a head injury that somehow greatly dampened his powers, making him much less powerful than at his previous encounter with the Thunderbolts. He also was more megalomaniacal than ever during his next escape, declaring himself capable of forgiving and punishing sins. The reorganized Avengers again fought him at Ryker's, and after wounding Captain America and Spider-Man, Graviton was downed and almost killed by an Extremis enhanced Iron Man.

After battling Iron Man once again, having been framed for murder by an associate of the Mandarin who possessed similar gravity-manipulating powers to his own – he uses his powers to trigger an aneurysm in his brain, concluding that he will never receive a fair trial and wanting to end things on his terms.

A 2010 storyline reveals that Graviton has a son with the same powers as he has, a criminal named Singularity, but he was revealed to be a normal child unrelated to Graviton, who had been brainwashed and mutated by the evil son of the Leader called Superior.

Graviton turns up alive as part of the new High Council of A.I.M. (alongside Andrew Forson, Jude the Entropic Man, Mentallo, Superia and an undercover Taskmaster) as the Minister of Science. When the Secret Avengers attempted to assassinate Andrew Forson, Graviton attacked them but was quickly stopped by an attack by sentient Iron Patriot armors led by the Hulk.

During the 2016 "Avengers: Standoff!" storyline, Graviton was shown in a training video for the S.H.I.E.L.D. Cadets working in the gated community Pleasant Hill being subjected to the Cosmic Cube-derived technology "Kobik", which turned him into a mild-mannered Pleasant Hill chef named Howie Howardson.

In the 2017 "Secret Empire" storyline, Graviton is recruited by Baron Helmut Zemo to join the Army of Evil.

Powers and abilities 
Franklin Hall was a normal human until empowered by an explosion that intermingled his molecules with sub-nuclear graviton particles generated by a nearby particle generator, which gave him the ability to manipulate gravitons (the subatomic particles that carry the force of gravitational attraction) and anti-gravitons (similar particles but with opposite force and spin of gravitons). Graviton could surround any person or object, including himself, with gravitons or anti-gravitons, thereby increasing or decreasing the pull of gravity upon it. Hall was able to manipulate gravitons for various uses, including the projection of highly concussive blasts, formation of gravitational force fields and levitation, and had also been proven capable of generating gravitational fields in various objects, making them attract any nearby matter (or individuals) not heavy enough or physically strong enough to resist. By decreasing the pull of gravity beneath him, then manipulating its direction of effect, he could fly at any speed or height at which he could still breathe. However, by using his force field generation capabilities he could also breathe in space. By increasing the pull of gravity beneath his opponents, he could pin them to the ground, having made them too heavy to move, or cause sufficient gravitational stress to impair the normal functioning of the human cardiovascular system. He could also cause an inanimate object (such as a  diameter rock) to radiate enough gravitons to enormously increase its own gravitational field, able to attract nearby matter and energy.

By rapidly projecting gravitons in a cohesive beam, he could generate a force blast with a maximum concussive force equivalent to the primary shockwave of an explosion of 20,000 pounds of TNT. He could also create a gravitational force field around him capable of protecting him from any concussive force up to and including a small nuclear weapon.

He could also erect a gravitational force-field of similar proportions. Graviton could use his power at maximum capacity for up to eight hours before mental fatigue significantly impaired his performance, and considerably longer (up to eighteen hours) if he conserved his energy during that time.

He was somehow also able to bestow the power of self-propelled flight to at least 70 people independent from his location; however he was also able to take this power away with but a thought.

With time and training, his powers further advanced, even to the extent of levitating an island miles above ground level, exerting his power even while sleeping, somewhat reshaping mountains on the Moon, and demonstrating the ability to lift a small stone in China while residing in L.A., then depositing it in Australia through a victim's head just to see if he could do so. By separating himself from Earth's gravitational field and instead attuning himself to the incredibly stronger gravitational field of the Sun, he was able to cross the distance from Earth to the Sun almost instantaneously, where his individual force field proved strong enough to withstand the forces of the Sun itself, effectively simulating long-range teleportation. To return from the Sun to Earth he utilized the Sun's gravitational field as a form of slingshot device and was able to cross the distance to Earth within minutes.

Hall's single most ambitious display of power was when he held almost every Marvel hero in stasis, including the Fantastic Four, some of the X-Men and such physical powerhouses as Thor, Hercules, the Hulk and Namor, and began using his powers to try reshaping the Earth in his image.

He also had the ability to detect extra-dimensional-shifts and phased or invisible objects through his immediate awareness of gravitational fluctuation and while he was not able to invoke dimensional portals, he was at least able to close them. He could simulate vast superhuman strength and durability using gravitonic fields to surround his body, but he could not actually manipulate density or increase his physical strength.

Aside from his powers to manipulate gravity, Hall had a PhD in Physics and was intellectually brilliant, with expertise in advanced physics, including teleportation. His greatest limitation was that he was emotionally and mentally very disturbed.

In other media

Television 

 Graviton appears in The Avengers: Earth's Mightiest Heroes two-part episode "The Breakout", voiced by Fred Tatasciore. This version is a physicist hired by S.H.I.E.L.D. to help recreate the super-soldier serum that created Captain America. However, Hall caused an accident that gave himself near-limitless gravitational powers. Soon after, when it became clear that he was now dangerous, S.H.I.E.L.D. Director Nick Fury placed Hall into an unconscious state and imprisoned him at the Raft. A decade later, when a technological problem occurred at the Raft, Graviton is freed and seeks revenge on Fury, only to be foiled by Thor, the Wasp, Iron Man, the Hulk, and Ant-Man.
 Two variations of Graviton appear in the Marvel Cinematic Universe series Agents of S.H.I.E.L.D..
 Dr. Franklin Hall appears in the season one episode "The Asset", portrayed by Ian Hart. This version is a Canadian physicist who was abducted by his former partner, Ian Quinn, to finish work on a gravity manipulator powered by a liquid metal-esque gravity-manipulating substance called gravitonium. Believing the gravitonium is dangerous, Hall attempts to destroy the device. S.H.I.E.L.D. agent Phil Coulson tries to save Hall, but the latter is pulled into the gravitonium. The substance reappears in the episode "Providence", when Hydra agents release it before their leader John Garrett gives the gravitonium back to Quinn. In a flashback depicted in the season five episode "Inside Voices", Quinn was also absorbed by the gravitonium following Garrett's defeat and has been arguing with Hall inside the substance ever since before Hydra eventually reclaimed it. During season five, Ruby Hale, a genetically-engineered Hydra agent, invades a subterranean Hydra facility and infuses herself with 8% of the gravitonium. She fails to control her newly acquired gravity-manipulating powers and kills one of Hydra's leaders, Werner von Strucker, before she is killed by S.H.I.E.L.D. agent Elena Rodriguez and S.H.I.E.L.D. recovers the remaining gravitonium. 
 When S.H.I.E.L.D. comes under attack by alien warriors sent by the Confederacy, Glenn Talbot infuses himself with the remaining gravitonium, along with Hall and Quinn's consciousnesses, and uses his new abilities to kill the warriors before taking Coulson to confront the Confederacy, who they learn intend to stop Thanos. Becoming increasingly narcissistic and unhinged under the corrupting influence of the gravitonium however, Talbot takes control of the Confederacy's primary ship, appropriates an alien costume, and murders the wisest leader to force his way into the alien group. Deliriously claiming that he can save the world from Thanos, Talbot kills his Hydra handler General Hale, forces Coulson's cooperation, and kidnaps the prophetic Inhuman Robin Hinton to search for more gravitonium. He is eventually defeated by Daisy Johnson, who blasts him into space, averting an alternate timeline where he inadvertently destroyed the Earth in his search for gravitonium.
 Graviton appears in Marvel Disk Wars: The Avengers. This version is a member of the Masters of Evil.

Film 
Graviton appears in Avengers Confidential: Black Widow & Punisher.

Video games 
 Graviton appears as a boss in The Amazing Spider-Man 2.
 Graviton appears as a boss in Marvel: Avengers Alliance 2.

References

External links 
 Graviton at Marvel.com

Characters created by Jim Shooter
Characters created by Sal Buscema
Comics characters introduced in 1977
Fictional Canadian people in comics
Fictional characters with gravity abilities
Fictional physicists
Marvel Comics male supervillains
Marvel Comics mutates
Marvel Comics scientists
Marvel Comics television characters